Aengus mac Umor (modern spelling: Aonghus mac Úmhór) was a mythical Irish king.

The Fir Bolg of Connacht were ruled by King Aonghus mac Úmhór. Dubhaltach Mac Fhirbhisigh states that Aonghus led his people, the Tuath mhac nUmhoir, to the coast of Galway Bay and the Aran Islands, after being driven out by warfare with "Clann Chuian and the kindred of the Gaoidhil (Gaels)". The fortress of Dún Aonghasa on Inishmore, which legend states he built, is still called after him. O'Rahilly places these events in the 2nd century BC.

Aonghus's son, Conall Caol, settled with his people in what was then the kingdom of Aidhne.

See also
 Cian d'Fhearaibh Bolg
 Senchineoil

References
 Early Irish History and Mythology,  T.F. O'Rahilly, Dublin Institute for Advanced Studies, 1946 (reprinted 2003)
 Irish Kings and High-Kings, Francis John Byrne, Dublin (1971;2003) Four Courts Press, 
  Leabhar Genealach. The Great Book of Irish Genealogies, Dubhaltach MacFhirbhisigh (ed. Nollaig Ó Muraíle), Dublin, De Burca, 2003–2004
 http://www.ucc.ie/celt/published/G105007/index.html

Fir Bolg
Kings of Connacht
Characters in Irish mythology
Legendary Irish kings